The 19th Central Politburo of the Chinese Communist Party was elected by the 1st Plenary Session of the 19th Central Committee of the Chinese Communist Party on 25 October 2017, shortly following the 19th National Congress of the Chinese Communist Party. It was nominally preceded by the 18th Politburo of the Chinese Communist Party and succeeded by the 20th Politburo of the Chinese Communist Party in October 2022.

Members

Standing Committee members

All members 
 In stroke order of surnames apart from PSC members

References 

Politburo of the Chinese Communist Party
2017 establishments in China
Xi Jinping
Li Keqiang